Al Green Gets Next to You is the 3rd studio album by American soul singer Al Green, released August 14, 1971.

Track listing
 "I Can't Get Next to You" (Barrett Strong, Norman Whitfield) – 3:52
 "Are You Lonely for Me, Baby?" (Bert Berns) – 4:02
 "God Is Standing By" (Johnny Taylor) – 3:14
 "Tired of Being Alone" (Al Green) – 2:43
 "I'm a Ram" (Green, Mabon "Teenie" Hodges) – 3:53
 "Driving Wheel" (Roosevelt Sykes) – 3:04
 "Light My Fire" (Robbie Krieger, Jim Morrison, Ray Manzarek, John Densmore) – 3:59
 "You Say It" (Al Green) – 2:57
 "Right Now, Right Now" (Al Green) – 2:53
 "All Because" (Al Green) – 2:42
 "Ride, Sally Ride" – (bonus track)
 "True Love" – (bonus track)
 "I'll Be Standing By" – (bonus track)

Later samples
"Light My Fire"
"Burning Season" by Killarmy from the album Silent Weapons for Quiet Wars
"All Because"
"Microphone Techniques" by 3rd Bass from the album Derelicts of Dialect
"Light My Fire"
"Ode to the Modern Man" by Atmosphere from the album Overcast!

References

1971 albums
Al Green albums
Capitol Records albums
Albums produced by Willie Mitchell (musician)